The 1926–27 Cincinnati Bearcats men's basketball team represented the University of Cincinnati during the 1926–27 NCAA men's basketball season. The head coach was Boyd Chambers, coaching his ninth season with the Bearcats. The team finished with an overall record of 13–5.

Schedule

|-

References

Cincinnati Bearcats men's basketball seasons
Cincinnati
Cincinnati Bearcats men's basketball team
Cincinnati Bearcats men's basketball team